Tianxin District is one of six urban districts of the prefecture-level city of Changsha, the capital of Hunan Province, China. The district is bordered by Yuetang District of Xiangtan to the south, Yuhua District to the east, Furong and Kaifu districts  to the north, Yuelu District across the Xiang river to the west. The district has 14 subdistricts under its jurisdiction, its administrative centre is at Qingyuan Subdistrict.

History
Tianxin District was formed on 22 April 1996 as a result of adjusting the administrative districts of Changsha. It covers most of the historic South District, including Yunanjie, Jinpenling, Chengnanlu, Shuyuanlu and Nandalu 5 subdistricts, Pozijie and Xueyuanjie two subdistricts of the historic West District, Shiren, Xinkai and Yuchang 3 villages of Yuhuating Township and Datuo Township of the historic Suburb District.

Muyun and Nantuo subdistricts of Changsha County were added to Tianxin District on 14 January 2015.

Subdivisions
According to the No.2 Notice on adjustment of administrative divisions of Hunan Province in 2015 published on February 27, 2015, Tianxin has 14 subdistricts under its jurisdiction, they are:

14 subdistricts
 Chennanlu
 Chilinglu
 Datuopu
 Guihuaping
 Heishipu
 Jinpengling
 Muyun
 Nantuo
 Pozijie
 Qingyuan, Changsha
 Wenyuan
 Xianfeng, Changsha
 Xinkaipu
 Yunanjie

Economy
According to preliminary accounting of the statistical authority, the gross domestic product of Tianxin District in 2017 was 87,674 million yuan (12,985 million US dollars), up by 9.4 percent over the previous year. Of this total, the value added of the primary industry was 165 million yuan (24 million US dollars), up by -19 percent, that of the secondary industry was 27,436 million yuan (4,064 million US dollars), up by 3.8 percent and that of the tertiary industry was 60,073 million yuan (8,897 million US dollars), up by 12.3 percent. The value added of the primary industry accounted for 0.19 percent of the GDP; that of the secondary industry accounted for 31.29 percent; and that of the tertiary industry accounted for 68.52 percent. The per capita GDP in 2017 was 134,088 yuan (19,860 US dollars).

It houses two economic development zone at the province level, the Muyun Economic Development Zone and the Tianxin Economic Development Zone.

Tourism 
Tianxin District is a place of cultural and historical attractions, including Tianxin Pavilion, Du Fu River Pavilion, Former Residence of Jia Yi, Former Residence of Li Fuchun, Site of Hunan First Normal University, and Fiery Palace. Changsha Bamboo Slips Museum also play significant role in the tourism of Tianxin District. The district's most visited park is the Changsha Ecological Zoo.

References

 
Districts of Changsha